Defense Logistics Agency (DLA) Curtis Bay Depot is a logistics center run by the Defense National Stockpile Center under the Defense Logistics Agency, and was a United States Army depot from 1918 to 1954. It is located in Curtis Bay, Maryland. Capital Gazette editor Jimmy DeButts proposed developing the currently unused land into a sports tourism complex.

References

Defense National Stockpile Center facilities
Military installations in Maryland
Defense Logistics Agency